The 1996 RCA Championships was a tennis tournament played on outdoor hard courts at the Indianapolis Tennis Center in Indianapolis, Indiana in the United States and was part of the Championship Series of the 1996 ATP Tour. The tournament ran from August 12 through August 18, 1996.

Finals

Singles

 Pete Sampras defeated  Goran Ivanišević 7–6(7–3), 7–5
 It was Sampras' 5th title of the year and the 43rd of his career.

Doubles

 Jim Grabb /  Richey Reneberg defeated  Petr Korda /  Cyril Suk 7–6, 4–6, 6–4
 It was Grabb's 1st title of the year and the 23rd of his career. It was Reneberg's 2nd title of the year and the 18th of his career.

References

RCA Championships
Atlanta Open (tennis)
RCA Championships
RCA Championships
RCA Championships